This is a list of newspapers in Belize.

Major newspapers 
 Amandala, established in 1969, offers a mix of national news, sports, and editorial opinion
 The Belize Times, official newspaper of the People's United Party
 The Guardian, official newspaper of the United Democratic Party
 The Reporter, weekly independent newspaper established in 1967

Minor newspapers 
 Ambergris Today: rival to The San Pedro Sun on Ambergris Caye
 Caye Caulker Chronicles: chief paper for village of Caye Caulker
 The Placencia Breeze: tourism paper for Placencia
 The San Pedro Daily: online newspaper
 The San Pedro Sun: respected source for San Pedro
 The Wabagari Post: local newspaper of Dangriga Town

Defunct newspapers 
 The Alliance Weekly: weekly newspaper published in Belize City (1990s)
 The Beacon: weekly newspaper published in Belize City (1980s)
 The Independent: soft news and opinions (2006–2007)
 The National Perspective: based in Belmopan (2008–2011)
 Star: local newspaper of Cayo District (2004–2016)
 Honduras Gazette: weekly newspaper published in Belize City (1826 to sometime during 18291838)

See also
 List of television stations in Belize

References

External links
 List of Belize newspapers at newspaperindex.com
 Global NewsNetwork (global-news.info): Belize

Belize

Newspapers